Major James Carroll (June 5, 1854 – September 16, 1907) was a US Army physician.

Carroll was born in England.  He moved to Canada in 1874, and enlisted in the U.S. Army in 1874. He graduated with an M.D. from the University of Maryland in 1891. After graduating Carroll studied bacteriology under Dr. William H. Welch at Johns Hopkins Hospital and assisted Walter Reed in pathology laboratories. Carroll and Reed later worked together at the Army Medical Museum in Washington and the Columbia University Medical School. In 1900 he served as an American physician and a member of the Yellow Fever Commission in Cuba, along with Walter Reed, Jesse William Lazear, and Aristides Agramonte.  He and Lazear subjected themselves to the bite of infectious mosquitoes to test the theory that mosquitoes were carriers of yellow fever. Lazear died, but Carroll recovered and completed the last, official experiments of the Yellow Fever Commission. After a trip to Washington D.C., Carroll returned to Cuba for additional studies in which he proved that blood from active cases of yellow fever contained sub-microscopic infective agents. In 1904, with permission from Army Surgeon-General Robert Maitland O'Reilly, Carroll tested an oral typhoid fever vaccine on himself and 12 other volunteers from the military. Due to faulty vaccine preparation by lab personnel, seven men came down with the disease. They all survived, but the Office of the Surgeon General did not publicize the results. Although, Carroll recovered from the initial yellow fever infection, his heart was irreparably damaged, and he died just seven years later.

Carroll was the inaugural president of the United States and Canadian Academy of Pathology.

He was buried at Arlington National Cemetery, in Arlington, Virginia.

References

External links

Death of Dr. James Carroll from Yellow Fever Experimentation

NCBI Biography
University of Virginia Health Sciences Library, A Guide to the Philip S. Hench Walter Reed Yellow Fever Collection – includes 154 boxes of items – documents related to Carroll's work and copies of correspondence.

1854 births
1907 deaths
United States Army Medical Corps officers
George Washington University faculty
People from Woolwich
Burials at Arlington National Cemetery
Deaths from yellow fever